Daniele Lazzari (born 3 December 1997) is an Italian footballer who plays as a goalkeeper for  club Grosseto.

Club career
Lazzari played at Lazio youth levels, loaned to different low-tier teams. He made his professional debut in the Lega Pro in Racing Roma, on 13 November 2016 against Piacenza, coming as a substitute of Luca Savelloni in the half-time. This was his last match in the 2016–17 third league. In the summer of 2018, Serie B side Salernitana signed him for an undisclosed fee.

On 25 July 2019, he signed with Rieti.

On 26 February 2020, he returned to Salernitana until the end of the 2019–20 season.

On 19 September 2020, he joined Juve Stabia. On 27 January 2022, his contract was terminated by mutual consent.

References

External links
 
 

1997 births
Living people
Footballers from Rome
Association football goalkeepers
Italian footballers
S.S.C. Bari players
Trapani Calcio players
S.S. Racing Club Roma players
Lupa Roma F.C. players
U.S. Salernitana 1919 players
S.S. Lazio players
F.C. Rieti players
S.S. Juve Stabia players
F.C. Grosseto S.S.D. players
Serie C players
Serie D players